A list of films produced by the Marathi language film industry based in Maharashtra in the year 1956.

1956 Releases
A list of Marathi films released in 1956.

References

Lists of 1956 films by country or language
 Marathi
1956